Kepler-277 is a large yellow star in the constellation of Lyra. It is 1.69  and 1.12 , with a temperature of 5946 K, a metallicity of -0.315 [Fe/H], and an unknown age. For comparison, the Sun has a temperature of 5778 K, a metallicity of 0.00 [Fe/H], and an age of about 4.5 billion years. The large radius in comparison to its mass and temperature suggest that Kepler-277 could be a subgiant star.

Planetary system

Kepler-277b 

Kepler-277b (KOI-1215.01) is the second most massive and third-largest rocky planet ever discovered, with a mass close to that of Saturn, It was discovered in 2014. Kepler-277b orbits close to its host star, with one orbit lasting 17.324 days.

Kepler-277c 

Kepler-277c (KOI-1215.02) is the third most massive and second-largest rocky planet ever discovered, with a mass about 64 times that of Earth. It was discovered in 2014. Kepler-277c orbits close to its host star, with one orbit lasting 33.006 days.

See also 

 List of stars in Lyra

References

Subgiant stars
Lyra (constellation)
Planetary transit variables
Planetary systems with two confirmed planets